The Borough of Darlington is a unitary authority and borough in County Durham, Northern England. The borough is named after the town of Darlington, and in 2011 had a population of 106,000.

It is in the Tees Valley mayoralty. The borough borders three local authority areas; County Durham is to the north and west, Stockton-on-Tees to the east and North Yorkshire to the south, the River Tees forming the border for the latter.

History

The current borough boundaries were formed on 1 April 1974, by the creation of a new non-metropolitan district of Darlington by the Local Government Act 1972, covering the previous county borough of Darlington along with nearly all of Darlington Rural District (the Newton Aycliffe parts of which went to Sedgefield). It remained part of County Durham for administrative purposes until reconstituted as a unitary authority on 1 April 1997. For ceremonial purposes it remains part of County Durham, with whom it continues to share certain local services, such as Fire and Rescue and Police. It is included within the Tees Valley area for both cultural and regional government administration.

Council

It is made up of 20 council wards, sixteen within the town of Darlington itself, which are also covered by the Darlington parliamentary constituency and four rural wards of Heighington & Coniscliffe, Hurworth, Middleton St George and Sadberge & Whessoe (part of the Sedgefield parliamentary constituency.

The council operates a Leader and Cabinet model of political leadership although a group of local residents aimed to force a referendum on moving to a system with directly elected executive Mayor. Their bid was unsuccessful.

The political composition of the council, as of a May 2019 local elections, is  Conservative 22;Labour 20; Liberal Democrats 3; Independent 3 and Green Party 2.  Since then, one Labour councillor has declared he is now an Independent.

Settlements
As well as Darlington itself the borough includes the surrounding villages of:
 Archdeacon Newton
 Barmpton
 Beaumont Hill
 Bishopton
 Blackwell
 Brafferton
 Coatham Mundeville
 Denton
 Great Burdon
 Great Stainton
 Heighington
 High Coniscliffe
Houghton
Houghton Bank
Houghton-le-Side
Hurworth
Hurworth-on-Tees
Hurworth Place
Neasham
 Killerby
 Little Stainton
 Low Dinsdale
Near airport
Middleton One Row
Middleton St George
Oak Tree
 Piercebridge
 Redworth
 Sadberge
 Summerhouse
Walworth
Walworth
Walworth Gate

It is home to Teesside International Airport (previously known as Durham Tees Valley Airport).

Economy
This is a chart of trend of regional gross value added of Darlington at current basic prices published (pp. 240–253) by Office for National Statistics with figures in millions of British Pounds Sterling.

 includes hunting and forestry

 includes energy and construction

 includes financial intermediation services indirectly measured

 Components may not sum to totals due to rounding

Freedom of the Borough
The following people and military units have received the Freedom of the Borough of Darlington.

Individuals
 John Williams: 24 November 2011. 
 Alasdair MacConachie: 24 November 2011.

Military Units
 The Light Infantry: 1996.
 The Rifles: 17 September 2010.

References

External links
  Darlington Borough Council
 Darlington Tourist Information
 Darlington Railway Centre & Museum
 Darlington Arts Centre & Civic Theatre

Video clips 
 Darlington Borough Council YouTube channel

 
Local government in County Durham
Unitary authority districts of England
Places in the Tees Valley
Local government districts of North East England
Boroughs in England